"Remember When (We Made These Memories)" is a song written by Bert Kaempfert, Charles Singleton and Eddie Snyder, and performed by Wayne Newton.  It reached #15 on the U.S. adult contemporary chart and #69 on the Billboard Hot 100 in 1965.  It was featured on his 1966 album, Wayne Newton...Now!

The song was produced by Steve Douglas arranged by Jimmie Haskell.

Other versions
Bert Kaempfert and His Orchestra released a version as the B-side to his 1965 single "Bye Bye Blues".
Max Bygraves released a version as the B-side to his 1966 single "Always Together".
The King Brothers released a version as the B-side to their 1966 single "Everytime I See You".
Johnny Mathis released a version on his 1970 album, Johnny Mathis Sings the Music of Bacharach & Kaempfert.

References

1965 songs
1965 singles
Wayne Newton songs
Johnny Mathis songs
Songs about nostalgia
Songs with music by Bert Kaempfert
Songs written by Charles Singleton (songwriter)
Songs written by Eddie Snyder
Capitol Records singles